Riana Rouge is a 1997 adult action-adventure game developed and published by Black Dragon Productions. It is one of the few titles that have earned an "Adults Only" rating from the ESRB.

Plot 
The game stars Playboy Playmate Gillian Bonner as Riana, a shy secretary who spies on her boss attempting to rape a co-worker. She enters the office and tries to help her, but she is overpowered by her boss and thrown out of the window. Somehow, she is transported to another world where she is a seductive warrior who must rescue the world from an evil dictator (her boss) and rescue her friend (the co-worker).

Development
Riana Rouge was distributed by Konami of America, and cost $1 million to produce.

Gameplay
The game had an interface which allowed players to control the heroine using an "emotivator," which determines the course of action according to whether the player chooses to feel seductive, compassionate, or afraid.

Reception
German gaming magazine PC Player gave the Windows version of Riana Rouge an overall score of 19%, and PC Joker gave it an overall score of 35%.

The game sold 100,000 copies.

References

External links 
 
 Riana Rouge at Giant Bomb

1997 video games
Action-adventure games
Erotic video games
Full motion video based games
Classic Mac OS games
Windows games
Video games developed in the United States
Video games featuring female protagonists
Video games with digitized sprites